Tyler Butterworth (born 6 February 1959, Redhill, Surrey) is an English actor.

Early life
Tyler Butterworth was born 6 February 1959 in Redhill, Surrey. His father was Peter Butterworth, who starred in many of the Carry On films. His mother was the actress and Margaret Thatcher impersonator Janet Brown. His first roles were as a child in the 1960s in such films as Darling (1965) and the Morecambe & Wise feature film The Magnificent Two (1967).

Film and television
He starred in the black comedy Consuming Passions (1988) opposite Vanessa Redgrave and Jonathan Pryce. On television he has appeared in Rumpole of the Bailey, Bergerac, Last of the Summer Wine, The Bill, The Darling Buds of May, Home to Roost Hetty Wainthropp Investigates and Osborne in the ITV sitcom Fiddlers Three.

He also played Proteus in the BBC Shakespeare adaption of The Two Gentlemen of Verona in 1983, Angelo in the CITV children's sci-fi comedy series Mike and Angelo for its first two series and Mr Archer in Whizziwig.

Personal life
Butterworth is married to actress Janet Dibley;  the couple have two sons.

External links

Tyler Butterworth at the BFI Film & TV Database

1959 births
English male television actors
English people of Scottish descent
People from Redhill, Surrey
Living people